Valiabad-e Deli Khomsir (also Romanized as Valīābād-e Delī Khomsīr) is a village in Kabgian Rural District, Kabgian District, Dana County, Kohgiluyeh and Boyer-Ahmad Province, Iran. At the 2006 census, its population was 140, in 31 families.

References 

Populated places in Dana County